The 1947–48 William & Mary Indians men's basketball team represented the College of William & Mary in intercollegiate basketball during the 1947–48 NCAA men's basketball season. Under the first year of head coach Barney Wilson, the team finished the season 13–10 and 8–7 in the Southern Conference. This was the 43rd season of the collegiate basketball program at William & Mary, whose nickname is now the Tribe. William & Mary played its home games at Blow Gymnasium.

The Indians finished in a tie for 8th place in the conference and qualified for the 1948 Southern Conference men's basketball tournament, hosted by Duke University at the Duke Indoor Stadium in Durham, North Carolina, where the Indians defeated Wake Forest in the opening round before losing to NC State in the quarterfinals.

The Indians played two teams for the first time this season: American International and Western Maryland.

Schedule

|-
!colspan=9 style="background:#006400; color:#FFD700;"| Regular season

|-
!colspan=9 style="background:#006400; color:#FFD700;"| 1948 Southern Conference Tournament

Source

References

William & Mary Tribe men's basketball seasons
William and Mary Indians
William and Mary Indians Men's Basketball Team
William and Mary Indians Men's Basketball Team